The Polynesian languages form a genealogical group of languages, itself part of the Oceanic branch of the Austronesian family.

There are 38 Polynesian languages, representing 7 percent of the 522 Oceanic languages, and 3 percent of the Austronesian family. While half of them are spoken in geographical Polynesia (the Polynesian triangle), the other half – known as Polynesian outliers – are spoken in other parts of the Pacific: from Micronesia to atolls scattered in Papua New Guinea, the Solomon Islands or Vanuatu. The most prominent Polynesian languages, in number of speakers, are Tahitian, Samoan, Tongan, Māori and Hawaiian.

The ancestors of modern Polynesians were Lapita navigators, who settled in the Tonga and Samoa areas about 3,000 years ago. Linguists and archaeologists estimate that this first population went through common development during about 1000 years, giving rise to Proto-Polynesian, the linguistic ancestor of all modern Polynesian languages. After that period of shared development, the Proto-Polynesian society split into several descendant populations, as Polynesian navigators scattered around various archipelagoes across the Pacific – some travelling westwards to already populated areas, others navigating eastwards and settling in new territories (Society Islands, Marquesas, Hawaii, New Zealand, Rapa Nui, etc.).

Still today, Polynesian languages show strong similarity, particularly cognate words in their vocabulary; this includes culturally important words such as tapu, ariki, motu, fenua, kava, and tapa as well as *sawaiki, the mythical homeland for some of the cultures.

Internal classification

Phylogenetic classification
Polynesian languages fall into two branches, Tongic and Nuclear Polynesian. Tongan and Niuean constitute the Tongic branch; all the rest are part of the Nuclear Polynesian branch.

Nuclear Polynesian
Ellicean
Ellicean–Outlier
Tuvaluan
Nukuoro (Nukuoro in the Federated States of Micronesia)
Kapingamarangi (on Kapingamarangi in Federated States of Micronesia)
Nukuria (Nuguria in eastern Papua New Guinea)
Takuu (Takuu Atoll in eastern Papua New Guinea)
Nukumanu (Nukumanu in the east of Papua New Guinea)
Ontong Java (or Luangiua; Ontong Java, Solomon Islands)
Sikaiana (Sikaiana, Solomon Islands)
Pileni (Reef Islands, Solomon Islands)
Samoic
Samoan
Tokelauan
Eastern Polynesian
Rapa Nui (Easter Island)
 Central–Eastern Polynesian
 Marquesic
Marquesan–Mangareva
Marquesan (Marquesas Islands, French Polynesia)
Mangareva (Gambier Islands, French Polynesia)
Hawaiian (Hawaii)
 Tahitic
Tahitian (Society Islands, French Polynesia)
Austral (Austral Islands, French Polynesia)
Rapa (Rapa Iti, French Polynesia)
Tuamotuan (Tuamotu Archipelago, French Polynesia)
Rarotongan (Cook Islands Māori, Cook Islands)
Rakahanga-Manihiki (Rakahanga and Manihiki, Northern Cook Islands)
Penrhyn (or Tongarevan; Tongareva, Northern Cook Islands)
Māori (New Zealand)
Moriori (Chatham Islands, New Zealand) †
Futunic (?):
Wallisian or East Uvean (fakaʻuvea) (Wallis Island, Wallis and Futuna)
Fakafutuna or (East) Futunan (Futuna Island, Wallis and Futuna)
West Uvean or Faga Uvea (Ouvéa off New Caledonia)
Pukapukan (Pukapuka, northern Cook Islands)
Anuta (Anuta Island, Solomon Islands)
Rennellese (Rennell and Bellona island, Solomon Islands)
Tikopia (Tikopia Island, Solomon Islands)
Vaeakau-Taumako (?) (Reef Islands and Taumako island, Solomon Islands)
Futuna-Aniwa or West Futunan (Futuna and Aniwa in Vanuatu)
Mele-Fila (Mele Island, Vanuatu)
Emae (Emae Island, Vanuatu)
Tongic
Tongan
Niuafoʻou (on Niuafoʻou Island, Tonga)
Niuean

History of classification

The contemporary classification of the Polynesian languages began with certain observations by Andrew Pawley in 1966 based on shared innovations in phonology, vocabulary and grammar showing that the East Polynesian languages were more closely related to Samoan than they were to Tongan, calling Tongan and its nearby relative Niuean "Tongic" and Samoan and all other Polynesian languages of the study "Nuclear Polynesian".

Previously, there had been lexicostatistical studies that squarely suggested a "West Polynesian" group composed of at least Tongan and Samoan and that an "East Polynesian" group was equally distant from both Tongan and Samoan. Lexicostatistics is a controversial . Since Pawley's 1966 publication, inferring the ancient relationships of the Polynesian languages  and the proofs of shared innovations.

Pawley published another study in 1967. It began the process of extracting relationships from Polynesian languages on small islands in Melanesia, the "Polynesian Outliers", whose languages Pawley was able to trace to East Futuna in the case of those farther south and perhaps to Samoa itself in the case of those more to the north.

Except for some minor differentiation of the East Polynesian tree, further study paused for almost twenty years until Wilson published a study of Polynesian pronominal systems in 1985 suggesting that there was a special relationship between the East Polynesian languages and all other Nuclear Polynesian but for Futunic, and calling that extra-Futunic group the "Ellicean languages". Furthermore, East Polynesian was found to more likely have emerged from extra-Samoan Ellicean than out of Samoa itself, in contradiction to the long assumption of a Samoan homeland for the origins of East Polynesian. Wilson named this new group "Ellicean" after the pre-independence name of Tuvalu and presented evidence for subgroups within that overarching category.

Marck, in 2000, was able to offer some support for some aspects of Wilson's suggestion through comparisons of shared sporadic (irregular, unexpected) sound changes, e. g., Proto-Polynesian and Proto-Nuclear-Polynesian *mafu 'to heal' becoming Proto-Ellicean *mafo. This was made possible by the massive Polynesian language comparative lexicon ("Pollex" – with reconstructions) of Biggs and Clark.

Internal correspondences
Partly because Polynesian languages split from one another comparatively recently, many words in these languages remain similar to corresponding words in others. The table below demonstrates this with the words for 'sky', 'north wind', 'woman', 'house' and 'parent' in a representative selection of languages: Tongan; Niuean; Samoan; Sikaiana; Takuu; Rapanui language; Tahitian; Cook Islands Māori (Rarotongan); Māori; North Marquesan; South Marquesan; Hawaiian and Mangarevan.

Certain regular correspondences can be noted between different Polynesian languages. Accordingly, "man" is tangata in Māori and kanaka in Hawaiian, and Māori roa "long" corresponds to Hawaiian loa. The famous Hawaiian greeting aloha corresponds to Māori aroha, "love, tender emotion". Similarly, the Hawaiian word for kava is awa.

Similarities in basic vocabulary may allow speakers from different island groups to achieve a significant degree of understanding of each other's speech. When a particular language shows unexpectedly large divergence in vocabulary, this may be the result of a name-avoidance taboo situation – see examples in Tahitian, where this has happened often.

Many Polynesian languages have been greatly affected by European colonization. Both Māori and Hawaiian, for example, have lost many speakers to English, and only since the 1990s have they resurged in popularity.

Grammatical characteristics

Personal pronouns
In general, Polynesian languages have three numbers for pronouns and possessives: singular, dual and plural. For example, in Māori: ia (he/she), rāua (they two), rātou (they 3 or more). The words rua (2) and toru (3) are still discernible in endings of the dual and plural pronouns, giving the impression that the plural was originally a trial (threesome) or paucal (a few), and that an original plural has disappeared.
Polynesian languages have four distinctions in pronouns and possessives: first exclusive, first inclusive, second and third. For example, in Māori, the plural pronouns are: mātou (we, exc), tātou (we, inc), koutou (you), rātou (they). The difference between exclusive and inclusive is the treatment of the person addressed. Mātou refers to the speaker and others but not the person or persons spoken to (i.e., "I and some others, but not you"), while tātou refers to the speaker, the person or persons spoken to, and everyone else (i.e., "You and I and others").

a and o possession
Many Polynesian languages distinguish two possessives. The a-possessives (as they contain that letter in most cases), also known as subjective possessives, refer to possessions that must be acquired by one's own action (alienable possession). The o-possessives or objective possessives refer to possessions that are fixed to someone, unchangeable, and do not necessitate any action on one's part but upon which actions can still be performed by others (inalienable possession). Some words can take either form, often with a difference in meaning. The distinction between one's birth village and one's current residence village can be made similarly.

Numerals in Polynesian languages
Numerals:

Orthography
Written Polynesian languages use orthography based on Latin script. Most Polynesian languages have five vowel qualities, corresponding roughly to those written i, e, a, o, u in classical Latin. However, orthographic conventions for phonemes that are not easily encoded in standard Latin script had to develop over time. Influenced by the traditions of orthographies of languages they were familiar with, the missionaries who first developed orthographies for unwritten Polynesian languages did not explicitly mark phonemic vowel length or the glottal stop. By the time that linguists trained in more modern methods made their way to the Pacific, at least for the major languages, the Bible was already printed according to the orthographic system developed by the missionaries, and the people had learned to read and write without marking vowel length or the glottal stop.

This situation persists in many languages. Despite efforts at reform by local academies, the general conservative resistance to orthographic change has led to varying results in Polynesian languages, and several writing variants co-exist. The most common method, however, uses a macron to indicate a long vowel, while a vowel without that diacritical mark is short, for example, ā versus a.  Sometimes, a long vowel is written double, e.g. Maaori.

The glottal stop (not present in all Polynesian languages, but, where present, one of the most common consonants) is indicated by an apostrophe, for example, 'a versus a.  Hawaiʻian uses the ʻokina, also called by several other names, a unicameral consonant letter used within the Latin script to mark the phonemic glottal stop. It is also used in many other Polynesian languages, each of which has its own name for the character. Apart from the ʻokina or the somewhat similar Tahitian ʻeta, a common method is to change the simple apostrophe for a curly one, taking a normal apostrophe for the elision and the inverted comma for the glottal stop. The latter method has come into common use in Polynesian languages.

Notes and references

Notes

See also
Proto-Polynesian language – the reconstructed ancestral language from which modern Polynesian languages are derived. 
ʻOkina – a glyph shaped like (but distinct from) an apostrophe: used to represent the glottal-stop consonant in some Polynesian Latin-based scripts.
Rongorongo – the undeciphered script of Easter Island (Rapanui).
List of English words of Polynesian origin

Further reading
 
  at archive.org.

Bibliography
 
 Irwin, Geoffrey (1992). The Prehistoric Exploration and Colonisation of the Pacific. Cambridge: Cambridge University Press.
 Krupa V. (1975–1982). Polynesian Languages, Routledge and Kegan Paul
 Lynch, J. (1998). Pacific Languages: an Introduction. University of Hawai'i Press.
 Lynch, John, Malcolm Ross & Terry Crowley (2002). The Oceanic languages. Richmond, Surrey: Curzon Press.
 Marck, Jeff (2000), Topics in Polynesian languages and culture history. Canberra: Pacific Linguistics.
Silva, Diego B (2019). Language policy in Oceania. Alfa, Rev. Linguíst 63 (2).

 
Central Pacific languages